Philip Malcolm Bednall (27 January 1931 – 18 December 2007) was an Australian cricketer. He played two first-class matches for South Australia in 1948/49.

See also
 List of South Australian representative cricketers

References

External links
 

1931 births
2007 deaths
Australian cricketers
South Australia cricketers